is a Japanese light novel series written by Nozomu Koryu and illustrated by Yasuyuki Shuri. It began as a web novel that is published in the Shōsetsuka ni Narō website since February 2015. It was later acquired by TO Books, who have published twenty-two volumes in print since October 2015. A manga adaptation, written by Midori Tomizawa and illustrated by Seriko Iida, has been serialized in the Nico Nico Seiga-based Comic Corona manga service since December 2017, with its chapters collected into nine tankōbon volumes as of January 2023. An anime television series adaptation by SynergySP is set to premiere in July 2023.

Characters

Media

Light novel
Written by Nozomu Koryu, the series began publication on the Shōsetsuka ni Narō website on February 17, 2015. TO Books acquired the series, and began publishing the series in print, with illustrations by Yasuyuki Shuri, starting on October 20, 2015. As of January 2023, twenty-two volumes have been released.

Manga
A manga adaptation, written by Midori Tomizawa and illustrated by Seriko Iida, began serialization in the Comic Corona manga service on December 25, 2017. As of January 2023, nine tankōbon volumes have been released. In April 2019, J-Novel Club announced that they licensed the manga for an English digital release.

Anime
In August 2022, it was announced that the series would be receiving an anime television series adaptation. The series is produced by SynergySP, with cooperation from Studio Comet, and directed by Naoyuki Kuzuya, with scripts written by Mitsutaka Hirota, character designs handled by Tomoko Miyakawa, and music composed by Hiroshi Nakamura. It is set to premiere in July 2023.

See also
 The Saint's Magic Power Is Omnipotent—A light novel series with the same illustrator

References

Further reading

External links
  at Shōsetsuka ni Narō 
  
  
  
 

2015 Japanese novels
2023 anime television series debuts
Anime and manga based on light novels
Cooking in anime and manga
Fantasy anime and manga
Fiction about reincarnation
Isekai anime and manga
Isekai novels and light novels
J-Novel Club books
Japanese fantasy novels
Japanese webcomics
Light novels
Light novels first published online
Shōjo manga
Shōsetsuka ni Narō
Upcoming anime television series
Webcomics in print